Tangier-Tétouan (Berber: Tanja-Tiṭṭawin, ⵜⴰⵏⵊⴰ-ⵜⵉⵟⵟⴰⵡⵉⵏ) was formerly one of the sixteen regions of Morocco from 1997 to 2015. It covered an area of 11,570 km² and had a population of 3,157,075. The capital was Tangier. In 2015, Al Hoceïma Province from Taza-Al Hoceima-Taounate was added to it to form the region of Tanger-Tétouan-Al Hoceïma.

Geography
 

The region has a coastline on the west formed by the Atlantic Ocean, on the north by the Strait of Gibraltar and on the east by the Mediterranean Sea. It borders the regions of Gharb-Chrarda-Béni Hssen and Taza-Al Hoceima-Taounate to the south, and also has a border with the Spanish exclave of Ceuta.

Administrative divisions
The region is made up into the following provinces and prefectures:

 Tangier Sub-Region
 Prefecture of Tangier-Assilah
 Fahs-Anjra Province
 Tétouan Sub-Region
 Prefecture of M'diq-Fnideq
 Chefchaouen Province
 Larache Province
 Ouezzane Province
 Tétouan Province

References

Former regions of Morocco